Bucher Peak is, at , one of the highest peaks in the west-central summit area of the Mount Murphy massif, in Marie Byrd Land. It was mapped by the United States Geological Survey from surveys and from U.S. Navy air photos, 1959–66, and named by the Advisory Committee on Antarctic Names for noted American geologist Walter H. Bucher, Professor of Geology at Columbia University, 1940–56.

References
 

Mountains of Marie Byrd Land